Piz Umbrail (3,033 m) is a mountain of the Ortler Alps, south of the Umbrail Pass (2,503 m), located on the border between Lombardy (Italy) and Graubünden (Switzerland).

The mountain surface is partly of rubble and partly covered by grass, and therefore of little interest to mountaineers, but its proximity to the Umbrail Pass and accessible surface make it a popular destination for other visitors. In winter it is a relatively easy destination for ski-mountaineers.

Normal route to the summit
The route starts at the Umbrail pass, very close to the Swiss border check point. There is a lot of free parking space around. You will need up to 90 minutes from there to the summit. No special equipment is needed, there are a few fixed chains along the route but those are not exposed sections, good marking all the time, and orientation is not a problem.

Access roads
There are three roads to the Umbrail pass; two from the Italian and one from the Swiss side. From Italy you have a south road from Bormio, and the road from the north-east which goes over the nearby Stelvio pass. From the Swiss side you have a road from the Val Müstair.

References

External links

 Piz Umbrail on Hikr.
 Piz Umbrail route description on Mountains for Everybody.

Mountains of the Alps
Alpine three-thousanders
Mountains of Graubünden
Mountains of Lombardy
Italy–Switzerland border
International mountains of Europe
Ortler Alps
Mountains of Switzerland
Val Müstair